Anna and Elizabeth is a 1933 German drama film directed by Frank Wisbar and starring Dorothea Wieck, Hertha Thiele and Mathias Wieman. The film reunited Wieck and Thiele who had starred in Mädchen in Uniform together two years earlier.

The film's sets were designed by Heinrich Beisenherz and Fritz Maurischat.

Synopsis
Elisabeth, a wealthy young aristocratic woman who uses a wheelchair, hears of Anna a young peasant girl who is apparently able to work miracles. She brings the reluctant village girl to live with her, and appears to have been cured simply through her sheer belief in Anna's powers. However, an attempt to demonstrate Anna's skills to the public fails, and in her despair Elisabeth throws herself off a cliff while Anna returns to her simple village life.

Reception
The film was reviewed in The New York Times  following its American release. The review praised the acting of Wieck, but was less impressed with that of Thiele. While admitting that the director had a natural flair for tragedy, the reviewer thought that the film was sometimes so slow-moving that it lapsed into ponderousness.

Cast
Dorothea Wieck as Elisabeth, Mistress of the manor von Salis
Hertha Thiele as Anna, peasant girl
Mathias Wieman as Mathias Testa
Maria Wanck as Margarete, Elisabeth's sister
Carl Balhaus as Martin
Willy Kaiser-Heyl as pastor
Roma Bahn as Mary Lane
Dorothea Thiess as Anna's mother
Carl Wery as Anna's father
Karl Platen as village doctor
Robert Eckert as estate neighbor
Margarete Kestra as Helena
Doris Thalmer as Nena
Sybil Smolova as Schiefhals

References

External links

1933 drama films
German drama films
Films of the Weimar Republic
Films of Nazi Germany
Films directed by Frank Wisbar
Terra Film films
Lesbian-related films
German LGBT-related films
Films scored by Paul Dessau
German black-and-white films
1930s German films
1930s German-language films